Sasunaga leucorina is a moth of the family Noctuidae. It is found in Sundaland, Sulawesi, the southern Moluccas, New Guinea and Queensland.

External links
Moths of Borneo
Australian Faunal Directory

Xyleninae